The 2016–17 Arizona State Sun Devils men's basketball team represented Arizona State University during the 2016–17 NCAA Division I men's basketball season. The Sun Devils were led by second-year head coach Bobby Hurley, and played their home games at Wells Fargo Arena in Tempe, Arizona as members of Pac–12 Conference. The Sun Devils finished the season 15–18, 7–11 in Pac-12 play to finish in eighth place. In the Pac-12 tournament, they defeated Stanford in the first round before losing to Oregon in the quarterfinals

Previous season
The Sun Devils finished the 2015–16 season 15–17, 5–13 in Pac-12 play to finish in 11th place. They lost in the first round of the Pac-12 tournament to Oregon State.

Off-season

Departures

2016 recruiting class

2017 recruiting class

Roster

 Freshman Sam Cunliffe left team 10 games into the season and elected to transfer.

Schedule and results

|-
!colspan=12 style=| Exhibition

|-
!colspan=12 style=| Non-conference regular season

|-
!colspan=12 style=| Pac-12 regular season

|-
!colspan=12 style=| Pac-12 tournament

References

Arizona State Sun Devils men's basketball seasons
Arizona State
2016 in sports in Arizona
2017 in sports in Arizona